Wretched was an American doom metal band from Maryland, formed in the 1990s.

Biography
Wretched was one of many Maryland doom bands to be picked up by Hellhound Records in the early 1990s. The band put out three albums on Hellhound before disbanding. Singer Dave Sherman would go on to play bass in Spirit Caravan and sing in Earthride. Following the recording of Center of the Universe Gary Isom joined the band on drums. Isom would later reunite with Sherman in Spirit Caravan.

The band has been on-again, off-again over the last decade. They officially disbanded in 2005 but as of 2006 had announced they were back together with a new line-up.

In 2007, Wretched re-released Center of the Universe on their own Highland Ridge Records.

In May 2009, Wretched broke up again after Jon Blank's death. Their EP Black Ambience was released in September.

Members
Dave Sherman – vocals
Jon Blank – vocals
Jeff Parsons – guitar
John Koutsioukis – bass
Cougin – drums
Gus Baslika – drums on Life Out There and Psychosomatic Medicine
Mike Phillips – drums on Center of the Universe
Gary Isom – drums

Discography
Life Out There (Hellhound Records 1993)
Psychosomatic Medicine (Hellhound Records 1994)
Center of the Universe (Hellhound Records 1995)
Black Ambience (Psychedoomelic Records 2009)

Reissue
Center of the Universe (Highland Ridge Records 2007)

References

American doom metal musical groups
Heavy metal musical groups from Maryland
Musical groups established in 1993
Musical groups disestablished in 2009
1993 establishments in Maryland
2009 disestablishments in Maryland
Hellhound Records artists